During the 2007–08 English football season, Darlington F.C. competed in League two of English football as well as the FA Cup, the League Cup and the League Trophy.

League table

Results

Football League Two

League Two play-offs

FA Cup

League Cup

Football League Trophy

Player details
Includes players with at least one appearance in any competition

|}

Transfers

Transfers In

Transfers Out

References

Darlington F.C. seasons
Darlington